Allenvale was a town in Victoria, Australia, located where the Bullumwaal - Bairnsdale Road crosses Boggy Creek, 3 miles south of Bullumwaal, in the Shire of East Gippsland.

The town began as a mining settlement known as Boggy Creek. The name was later changed in honour of the first postmaster, Mr. Allen.

References